Jaakko Pietilä (25 August 1912 – 29 April 1983) was a Finnish wrestler. He competed in the men's freestyle welterweight at the 1936 Summer Olympics.

References

External links
 

1912 births
1983 deaths
Finnish male sport wrestlers
Olympic wrestlers of Finland
Wrestlers at the 1936 Summer Olympics
People from Ilmajoki
Sportspeople from South Ostrobothnia